Envaatnags Eflos Solf Esgantaavne is the fourth full-length studio album released by the black metal band Horna. The title of the album is complete gibberish unless you remove the even letters, with the remaining odd letters spelling "Evangels of Satan", and the even letters spelling it backwards. This technically makes this album the band's only English titled release. It was released in 2005 on Woodcut records.
The song "Kuilunhenki" is exclusive to the CD and digital versions.

Track listing

Personnel

Additional personnel
 Christophe Szpajdel - logo

External links
Metal Archives
Official Horna Site 

Horna albums
2005 albums